John Herdman (born 19 July 1975) is an English professional football manager who is the head coach of the Canada men's national team.

Coaching career

Early career 
Herdman began coaching football at a young age in England, while he was a student and part-time university lecturer at Northumbria University. He was a development coach for Sunderland's youth academy until 2001, when he moved to New Zealand.

New Zealand women's 
Herdman arrived in New Zealand and joined the national association football programme in 2003, initially acting as Coach Education Manager and later as the Director of Football Development. Herdman was head coach for the New Zealand women's national football team from 2006 to 2011. Working with the national women's teams, he led the U-20 squad to the World Championship in 2006 and the later renamed U-20 World Cup in 2010. He also guided the senior squad to the FIFA Women's World Cups in 2007 and 2011 as well as the 2008 Summer Olympics in Beijing.

During his time in New Zealand, Herdman played amateur football for NRFL Division 2 club Hibiscus Coast.

Canada women's 
Herdman took over for the Canada women's national soccer team in 2011 from Carolina Morace after Canada finished last in their 2011 FIFA Women's World Cup group. Shortly after, he led them to a gold medal finish at the 2011 Pan American Games in Mexico. He guided the team through the CONCACAF Olympic qualifying tournament in Vancouver, Canada, securing one of two qualifying spots for the 2012 Olympic Games in London that summer, where they won the bronze medal. At the 2015 FIFA Women's World Cup in Canada, Herdman guided Canada to a first place finish in their group, eventually getting eliminated in the quarter-finals, a 2–1 loss to England. The team retained their bronze medal at the 2016 Olympic Games in Rio de Janeiro.

Canada men's
On 8 January 2018, Herdman was named head coach of the Canada men's national soccer team. He "also becomes men's national director, with responsibility for all age groups from under-14s upward".

In 2021, he guided the team up the FIFA World Rankings from 72nd to 40th, its highest position to date, to earn the team the honour of "Most Improved Side" of the year. On 10 February 2022, he improved Canada to 33rd in the FIFA World Rankings.

On 27 March 2022, he led the team to qualify for the 2022 FIFA World Cup, its first World Cup in 36 years, becoming the first manager to have successfully led both the national women's and men's teams of a nation to qualify for a World Cup. Canada's first match of the tournament against Belgium on November 23 ended in a 1–0 loss, despite Canada dictating most of the play, and failing to convert any of their 22 shots, including a penalty shot. Four days later, Canada lost 4–1 to Croatia, despite scoring first, eliminating Canada from the tournament after two matches. Canada were defeated 2–1 by Morocco in their final group match on December 1, finishing fourth in the group (and 31st overall in the tournament) with zero points.

Personal life 
Herdman is originally from Consett, County Durham, England. Herdman is married to his childhood sweetheart, Claire, and has two children, Lilly and Jay who plays in the Vancouver Whitecaps development system, as well as the New Zealand U20 team.

Managerial statistics

Honours
Canada women
 Summer Olympics: bronze medal: 2012, 2016
 Pan American Games: 2011
 Algarve Cup: 2016

References

External links

Canada Soccer Staff page (position listed under National Teams Department)

1975 births
Living people
English football managers
Expatriate soccer managers in Canada
Canada women's national soccer team managers
2007 FIFA Women's World Cup managers
2011 FIFA Women's World Cup managers
2015 FIFA Women's World Cup managers
Sportspeople from Consett
English expatriate sportspeople in Canada
2019 CONCACAF Gold Cup managers
2021 CONCACAF Gold Cup managers
New Zealand women's national football team managers
Canada men's national soccer team managers
English expatriate football managers
New Zealand Olympic coaches
Sunderland A.F.C. non-playing staff
Association football coaches
English expatriate sportspeople in New Zealand
2022 FIFA World Cup managers